Prince Achileas-Andreas of Greece and Denmark  (born 12 August 2000) is a member of the non-reigning Greek royal family and the extended Danish royal family. He is the second son and third child of Crown Prince Pavlos of Greece and Marie-Chantal Miller. His paternal grandparents are Constantine II of Greece and Anne-Marie of Denmark, who were the last King and Queen of the Hellenes. He is currently a student at New York University.

Early life
Achileas-Andreas was born on 12 August 2000 at Weill Cornell Medical Center in New York City. He was christened in a Greek Orthodox ceremony at St. Sophia's Cathedral in London on 7 June 2001. He grew up in London from 2004, when his family decided to move to England to stay near his paternal grandparents. He was educated at Wellington College in Berkshire. He moved back to New York when his older brother and sister started university. Between 2017 and 2019, he made guest appearances on the American television soap opera The Bold and the Beautiful. He uses the stage name Achi Miller.

References

External links 

 Christening of Achileas-Andreas
 Prince Achileas-Andreas of Greece and Denmark

2000 births
Living people
American people of Canadian descent
American people of Danish descent
American people of Ecuadorian descent
American people of English descent
American people of German descent
American people of Greek descent
American people of Swedish descent
Greek people of Danish descent
Greek people of English descent
Greek people of German descent
House of Glücksburg (Greece)
Members of the Church of Greece
Danish princes
Greek princes
Greek Orthodox Christians from the United States
People educated at Wellington College, Berkshire